Older Sister   is a Soviet feature film, shot in 1966, Georgy Natanson on the play by Alexander Volodin   My older sister.

Plot
Orphans Lida and Nadya have been living in the care of his uncle, who took them to the education of the children's home.  Uncle sincerely dreams of a happy life for the nieces and girls, often in defiance of their own destiny, follow his advice.  So big sister – Nadya – abandons his dream and doing everything to become the youngest actress, but years later she still comes to the theater.

Cast
 Tatyana Doronina as Nadya, older sister
 Natalya Tenyakova as Lydia,  younger sister
 Mikhail Zharov as Dmitry Petrovich Ukhov (uncle Mitya)
 Vitaly Solomin as Kirill
 Leonid Kuravlyov as Volodya
 Valentina Sharykina as Shura
 Yevgeniy Yevstigneyev as Ogorodnikov
 Oleg Basilashvili as Oleg Medynsky
 Inna Churikova as Nelly
 Viktor Ilichyov as entrant

References

External links
 

1966 films
1966 drama films
Mosfilm films
Soviet drama films
Soviet black-and-white films